Wakehurst and Chiddingly Woods is a  biological and geological Site of Special Scientific Interest south-east of Crawley in West Sussex, England. It is a Nature Conservation Review site, Grade I, and part of it is a Geological Conservation Review site.

These woods have steep sided valleys formed by streams cutting through Wadhurst Clay and Tunbridge Wells sands, exposing outcrops of sandstone. The valleys have a warm, moist micro-climate, with a rich variety of ferns, mosses, liverworts and lichens. There is a diverse breeding bird community. Chiddingly Wood is geologically important because weathering of its sandstone has produced sculptured blocks and a comprehensive set of micro-weathering features.

References

Sites of Special Scientific Interest in West Sussex
Geological Conservation Review sites
Nature Conservation Review sites
Ardingly
Forests and woodlands of West Sussex